Neraka has a number of meanings.

 Neraka is another spelling of Naraka, the underworld and Hell in Dharmic traditions, such as Buddhism and Hinduism.
 The Knights of Neraka is the name the Knights of Takhisis took after the Chaos War.